Accelerator may refer to:

In science and technology

In computing 
Download accelerator, or download manager, software dedicated to downloading
Hardware acceleration, the use of dedicated hardware to perform functions faster than a CPU
Graphics processing unit or graphics accelerator, a dedicated graphics-rendering device
Accelerator (library), a library that allows the coding of programs for a graphics processing unit
Cryptographic accelerator, performs decrypting/encrypting
Web accelerator, a proxy server that speeds web-site access
Accelerator (Internet Explorer), a form of selection-based search
Accelerator table, specifies keyboard shortcuts for commands
Apple II accelerators, hardware devices designed to speed up an Apple II computer
PHP accelerator, speeds up software applications written in the PHP programming language
SAP BI Accelerator, speeds up online analytical processing queries
SSL/TLS accelerator, offloads public-key encryption algorithms to a hardware accelerator
TCP accelerator, or TCP Offload Engine, offloads processing of the TCP/IP stack to a network controller
Keyboard shortcut, a set of key presses that invoke a software or operating system operation

 Accelerator or AFU (Accelerator Function Unit): a component of IBM's Coherent Accelerator Processor Interface (CAPI)

In physics and chemistry
Accelerator (chemistry), a substance that increases the rate of a chemical reaction
Araldite accelerator 062, or Dimethylbenzylamine, an organic compound
Cement accelerator, an admixture that speeds the cure time of concrete
Particle accelerator, a device which uses electric and/or magnetic fields to propel charged particles to high speeds
Accelerator-driven system (ADS), a nuclear reactor coupled to a particle accelerator
Accelerator mass spectrometry (AMS), a form of mass spectrometry
Tanning accelerator, chemicals that increase the effect of ultraviolet radiation on human skin
Vulcanizing accelerators, chemical agents to speed the vulcanization of rubber

Firearms 
.22 Accelerator or Remington Accelerator, a type of .224 caliber bullet
Electricothermal accelerator, a weapon that uses a plasma discharge to accelerate its projectile
Magnetic accelerator gun, a weapon that converts magnetic energy into kinetic energy for a projectile
Ram accelerator, a device for accelerating projectiles using ramjet or scramjet combustion
Produce accelerators, cannons which use air pressure or combustion to launch large projectiles at low speed

Other technologies 
Accelerator, gas pedal or throttle, a foot pedal that controls the engine speed of an automobile
Accelerator Coaster, a roller coaster that uses hydraulic acceleration

In entertainment 
The Accelerators, US rock band
Accelerator (Royal Trux album), their seventh studio album, released in 1998
Accelerator (The Future Sound of London album), released in 1992
"Accelerator", a 1993 single by Gumball
"Accelerator", a song by band The O.A.O.T.'s, on their album Typical
"Accelerator", a song by the band Primal Scream from their album XTRMNTR
XLR8R (pronounced "accelerator"), a magazine and website that covers music, culture, style, and technology
Accelerator (To Aru Majutsu No Index), one of the main characters in the anime series Toaru Majutsu no Index
Accelerator (Universal Studios Singapore), a whirling twirling ride that spins guests around
PC Accelerator, a personal computer game magazine
The Accelerators (comics), a comic book created by Ronnie Porto and Gavin Smith

Other uses 
 Accelerator pedal or gas pedal
 Seed- or startup-accelerator, an organization that offers advice and resources to help small businesses grow
 Accelerator effect, economic stimulus to private fixed investment due to growth in aggregate demand
 Saskatoon Accelerators, a professional soccer team based in Saskatoon, Canada
 Accelerationism, critical and social theory

See also
 Accelerant
 Acceleration (disambiguation)
 Accelerate (disambiguation)